Paratephritis transitoria is a species of tephritid or fruit flies in the genus Paratephritis of the family Tephritidae.

Distribution
Russia.

References

Tephritinae
Insects described in 1934
Diptera of Asia
Taxa named by Boris Rohdendorf